The  is a  branchline in Chiba Prefecture, Japan, operated by the private railway operator Keisei Electric Railway. It branches off from the Keisei Main Line at Keisei Narita Station to Higashi-Narita Station (the former Narita Airport Station).

Stations

History
The line opened on 21 May 1978. Keisei plans to introduce driver-only operation on this line, as well as the Kanamachi, Chihara, and Shibayama Railway lines and by the end of November 2022.

References

Higashi-Narita Line
Railway lines in Chiba Prefecture
1500 V DC railway electrification